Peter Francis Raeside Oliver (born 14 August 1948, in Dunfermline) is a former professional footballer, who played as a defender for Heart of Midlothian, York City & Huddersfield Town

References

External links

1948 births
Living people
Footballers from Dunfermline
Scottish footballers
Association football defenders
English Football League players
Scottish Football League players
Heart of Midlothian F.C. players
York City F.C. players
Huddersfield Town A.F.C. players
Scotland under-23 international footballers